Kenneth Gangnes (born 15 May 1989) is a Norwegian former ski jumper. He debuted at the World Cup in March 2008 in Lillehammer, and won his first World Cup event in Lysgårdsbakken on 6 December 2015. After his best season, which he ended with the 3rd place overall in the World Cup, he tore his ACL in his left knee, and missed the 2016–17 season. He returned for the 2017 Summer Grand Prix, where he placed second in Hakuba on 26 August 2017. In early November 2017, two weeks before the start of the season, he suffered another ACL torn and missed another season.

World Cup

Standings

Wins

Individual starts (62)

References

External links 

1989 births
Living people
People from Østre Toten
Norwegian male ski jumpers
Sportspeople from Innlandet
21st-century Norwegian people